Pantun Sunda is a type of Sundanese oral narrative performance interspersed with songs and music played on a kacapi, a kind of zither. A pantun is intended to be recited during an evening-length performance during which a single performer relates the story of a hero's initiation: The protagonist leaves his kingdom in order to seek experiences, beautiful princesses to become his wife, power, other kingdoms to subject, the realization of a dream (Rosidi 1984a:143); after having succeeded in reaching his goal he finally returns to his kingdom. Alongside descriptions of historical events, the stories often contain mythical elements. Pantun were originally not written down, the bards often being illiterate and in many cases blind. Originally the performances had a sacred character, as was clear from the offerings made at the beginning of the recitation and also from the content of the introductory part of the story, called rajah, which was an invocatory song, imploring the help of divine figures to ward off bad influences. The linguistic form of the pantun was not strictly fixed, however the dominant form employed in most pantun is the octosyllabic verse. For a detailed description of the nature and form of a Sundanese pantun you are referred to Eringa (1949), to Hermansoemantri (1977–79).

Currently there are few Pantun Sunda shows performed, due to a decline in popularity of the form following the widespread introduction of radio and television in households throughout West Java.

Transcription of pantun stories
Pantun, being oral texts, were not written down in the Sundanese literary tradition; only late in the nineteenth century were the first pantun put down in writing (in the beginning usually in cacarakan script) at the instigation of Western (Dutch) enthusiasts. After the establishment of Indonesia, Sundanese scholars made important contributions to the study of pantun, by publishing more oral texts as well as by critically investigating them. Special mention should be made of a project by Ajip Rosidi who in the early seventies had a considerable number of pantun recorded as they were performed by singers from various areas in West Java (see Rosidi 1973). The recorded pantun was transcribed and in stenciled form circulated in limited circle. Later on a number of them were published in book form, such as Mundinglaya di Kusumah (1986). An excellent study of the literally structure of the pantun was written by Hermansoemantri (1977–79); Kartini et al. (1984) wrote a useful comparative analysis on the plot of the pantun, based on a survey of 35 pantun stories. A valuable work on the musical aspects of pantun performances, based on extensive data collected in the field, was written by A. N. Weintraub (1990).

In the Sanghyang Siksakanda ng Karesian, dated 1518, pantun are mentioned: "hayang nyaho di pantun ma: Langgalarang, Banyakcatra, Siliwangi, Haturwangi, prepantun tanya" (if you want to know pantun, such as Langgalarang, Banyakcatra, siliwangi, Haturwangi, ask the pantun singer, Atja and Danasasmita 1981a:14). Throughout the ages many ancient elements have been preserved, even though the content of the stories told and the language used underwent changes and adaptations. Not only are there a number of Arabic words present in many pantun texts, which in pre-Islamic Old Sundanese text are lacking; the repertoire of present-day pantun singers include Islamic tales as is clear from the list in Weintraub (1990:23-4).

List of pantun stories

Based on Budi Rahayu Tamsyah in his book Kamus Istilah Tata Basa jeung Sastra Sunda, there are pantun stories as follows:

Ciung Wanara
Lutung Kasarung
Mundinglaya di Kusumah
Aria Munding Jamparing
Banyakcatra
Badak Sangorah
Badak Singa
Bima Manggala
Bima Wayang
Budak Manjor
Budug Basu /Sri Sadana / Sulanjana
Bujang Pangalasan
Burung Baok
Buyut Orenyeng
Dalima Wayang
Demung Kalagan
Deugdeug Pati Jaya Perang / Raden Deugdeug Pati Jaya Perang Prabu Sandap Pakuan
Gajah Lumantung
Gantangan Wangi
Hatur Wangi
Jaka Susuruh
Jalu Mantang
Jaya Mangkurat
Kembang Panyarikan / Pangeran Ratu Kembang Panyarikan
Kidang Panandri
Kidang Pananjung
Kuda Gandar
Kuda Lalean
Kuda Malela
Kuda Wangi
Langla Larang
Langga Sari
Langon Sari
Layung Kumendung
Liman Jaya Mantri
Lutung Leutik / Ratu Bungsu Karma Jaya
Malang Sari
Manggung Kusuma
Matang Jaya
Munding Jalingan
Munding Kawangi
Munding Kawati
Munding Liman
Munding Mintra
Munding Sari Jaya Mantri
Munding Wangi
Nyi Sumur Bandung
Paksi Keling / Wentang Gading
Panambang Sari
Panggung Karaton
Parenggong Jaya
Raden Mangprang di Kusumah
Raden Tanjung
Raden Tegal
Rangga Sawung Galing
Rangga Gading
Rangga Katimpal
Rangga Malela
Rangga Sena
Ratu Ayu
Ratu Pakuan
Ringgit Sari
Senjaya Guru
Siliwangi

References 

Music of West Java
Sundanese literature
Sundanese music